Moveable may refer to:
 A Moveable Feast
 Moveable feast
 Movable type
 Moveable bridge
 History of printing in East Asia

See also 
Personal property